Flémalle is a municipality of Wallonia located in the province of Liège, Belgium. 

On January 1, 2006, Flémalle had a total population of 25,140. The total area is 36.68 km² which gives a population density of 685 inhabitants per km².

Places

Districts 
Awirs (pop: 2,869) (including the village of Gleixhe)
Flémalle-Grande (Walloon: Li Grande Flémåle)
Flémalle-Haute (Walloon: Li Hôte Flémåle) (including the village of Chokier)
Ivoz-Ramet
Mons-lez-Liège

Hamlets 
Cahottes
Trixhes

Population history

Twinnings

 Piombino, Italy

See also 
 List of protected heritage sites in Flémalle
 Robert Campin, a painter (14th century), also known as "Le maître de Flémalle" (The Master of Flémalle)
 André Cools, a Belgian politician who was nicknamed "Le maître de Flémalle" (Flémalle's master).

References

External links
 
Official website (in French)
Site du club d'aïkido de Flémalle (in French)
Perspectives – Organisme d'insertion socio professionnel à Flémalle (in French)

 
Municipalities of Liège Province